Shaheed Dhirendranath Datta Stadium, also known as Comilla Stadium, is a multi-purpose stadium located in Comilla, Bangladesh. It is the current home venue of Dhaka Mohammedan and Chittagong Abahani Limited in Bangladesh Premier League Football. It is also occasionally used for cricket. It is the largest stadium in eastern Bangladesh. The stadium is named after Dhirendranath Datta.

Comilla district sports association said that" in future, there will be floodlight and electric board in the stadium. The work of the contraction on the second floor of the stadium will begin soon " The pitch and the outfield of the stadium is very well. There is a capacity of 18,000 people in this stadium (officially)But the highest audience attendance of the stadium was over 30,000 in a local T-20 cup tournament.

Renovation
In 2016, the Government of Bangladesh appropriated  to renovate the stadium.

See also
 Stadiums in Bangladesh
List of football stadiums in Bangladesh
 List of cricket grounds in Bangladesh

References

Football venues in Bangladesh
Cricket grounds in Bangladesh
Cumilla